A number of steam-powered tugs were named Aid, including:

, in service 1914–40
, in service 1947–61

Ship names